Pasin may refer to:

People
 Ali Rıza Pasin (1890–1946), Turkish physician
 Antonio Pasin (1897–1990), Italian-American toymaker
 Dave Pasin (born 1966), American ice hockey player
 Jeanette Pasin Sloan (born 1946), American visual artist
 Tony Pasin (born 1977), Australian politician

Places
 Pasin Darreh, Iran
 Pašin Potok, Croatia
 Pasinler, Erzurum, Turkey